Several merchant ships and one US Navy tug have been named Sagamore.

 Lake Feodora, renamed Sagamore 1926–34, US screw steamboat, official number 219574. Wrecked in 1934.
 Kenordoc, US barge, official number 157506. Named David Z. Norton 1898–1904. Named Sagamore 1904–47. Named Kenordoc 1945–56. Scrapped 1956.
 Sagamore, US whaleback barge built in 1892, official number 57932. Sank after a collision in 1901.
 , a UK cargo ship built in 1892 and torpedoed in 1917 by U-49.
 , a whaleback cargo ship built in England in 1893, renamed Ilva and scuttled in 1917 by UC-69.
 Sagamore, US steam yacht, rebuilt as a freight propeller, official number 116211. Ultimate disposition unknown.
 Sagamore, US Navy tug. Named Sagamore 1944–48. Renamed John E. McAllister 1948–55. Scrapped 1955.
 Sagamore, a UK bulk carrier built in 1957, renamed Captain Alberto in 1975 and Tania in 1989 and scrapped in 1992.
 Sagamore, US cargo ship built 1996.

References

Ship names